Tarrytown is the name of some places in the United States of America:

Tarrytown, New York
Tarrytown, Florida
Tarrytown, Georgia
Tarrytown, Austin, Texas
Sleepy Hollow, New York, formerly known as North Tarrytown.

Fictional towns 
Tarrytown is in a hilly area with enough rain to keep the land green, and frost and snow sometimes in the winter; forested mountains and a desert are nearby.